The Iowa Open is the Iowa state open golf tournament, open to both amateur and professional golfers. It is organized by the Iowa section of the PGA of America. It has been played annually since 1927 at a variety of courses around the state.

Winners

2022 Matthew Meneghetti
2021 Ryan Cole
2020 Chris Naegel
2019 Matthew Walker
2018 Dan Woltman
2017 Nyasha Mauchaza
2016 Nathan Stamey
2015 Adam Schenk
2014 Dylan Jackson
2013 Sean McCarty
2012 John Hurley
2011 Kevin DeNike
2010 Zack Vervaecke
2009 Vince India (amateur)
2008 Sean McCarty
2007 Jon Olson
2006 Cory Braunschweig
2005 Sean McCarty
2004 Derek Lamely
2003 Gary Rusnak
2002 Zach Johnson
2001 Zach Johnson
2000 Jeff Schmid
1999 Jamie Rogers
1998 Caine Fitzgerald
1997 Sean McCarty
1996 Gene Elliott
1995 Ken Schall
1994 Mike McCoy
1993 Kevin DeNike
1992 Dave Rueter
1991 Curt Schnell
1990 Mark Egly
1989 Kevin DeNike
1988 Ken Schall
1987 Kevin DeNike
1986 Mike Bender
1985 Gene Elliott
1984 Greg Tebbutt
1983 J.D. Turner
1982 Curt Schnell
1981 Bob Moreland
1980 Brad Schuchat
1979 J.D. Turner
1978 Curt Schnell
1977 Rufus James
1976 Bob Erickson
1975 John Frillman
1974 Joe Wall
1973 John Benda
1972 Karl Smith
1971 J.D. Turner
1970 J.D. Turner
1969 J.D. Turner
1968 Eddie Longert
1967 Bob Fry
1966 Joe Brown
1965 Joe Brown
1964 Steve Spray
1963 Ed Wysocki
1962 Bob Stone
1961 Clyde McIntire
1960 Dick Knight
1959 Bob Stone
1958 Bob Stone
1957 Wally Ulrich
1956 Ray Goodell
1955 Bob Asteford
1954 Joe Brown
1953 No tournament
1952 Neil Plopper
1951 Jim English
1950 Labron Harris
1949 Dick Turner
1948 Joe Brown
1947 Art Kock and Earnie Tardiff
1946 Leonard Dodson
1943–1945 No tournament
1942 Pat Wilcox
1941 Pat Wilcox
1940 Pat Wilcox
1939 Herman Keiser
1938 Joe Brown
1937 Leonard Dodson
1936 Clarence Yockey
1935 Johnny Dawson
1934 Harold "Jug" McSpaden
1933 Denmar Miller
1932 Pete Jordan
1931 Bob McCray
1930 Art Andrews
1929 Denmar Miller
1928 Art Bartlett
1927 Art Bartlett

References

External links
PGA of America – Iowa section
List of winners

Golf in Iowa
PGA of America sectional tournaments
State Open golf tournaments
Recurring sporting events established in 1927
1927 establishments in Iowa